Eduardo Fuertes was a Filipino international footballer who played as a goalkeeper.

Career
Fuertes was born on April 18, 1943 in the town of Janiuay in Iloilo, Philippines to Crispin and Enriqueta Fuertes. As an association football player, he was part of the Philippine youth national team which participated at the 1963 AFC Youth Championship where he was conferred a 5th Asian Youth Football Tournament player award. He was named Mr. Football by the Philippine Sportswriters Association in 1967. He also played for the senior national team that played at the 1968 Summer Olympics qualifiers in 1967. Fuertes played in the record 0-15 defeat to Japan.

For 18 years he also served in the Philippine Navy. He later decided to reside in the United States in Bremerton, Washington and worked as a Data Processor at Puget Sound Naval Shipyard.

He died on July 27, 2014 and was survived by his wife Enestina Fuertes whom he was married for 42 years.

References

1943 births
2014 deaths
Filipino footballers
Philippines international footballers
Footballers from Iloilo
Association football goalkeepers